Several justices of the North Carolina Supreme Court and judges of the North Carolina Court of Appeals were elected to eight-year terms by North Carolina voters on November 5, 2002. Party primary elections were held on Sept. 10. This was the last year in which statewide judicial elections were partisan. 

The result of the election was that all incumbent Democrats went down to defeat, and only one Democrat won a seat that was open (i.e. the incumbent chose not to run for another term).

Supreme Court (Butterfield seat)
Incumbent G. K. Butterfield, a Democrat, had been appointed by Gov. Mike Easley and faced election for the first time. He was defeated by attorney Edward Thomas Brady, a Republican. 

In the Republican primary, Brady had defeated Judge Ralph A. Walker.

Supreme Court (Orr seat)
Incumbent Robert F. Orr, a Republican, defeated North Carolina Court of Appeals Judge Robert C. Hunter, a Democrat. 

In the Democratic primary, Hunter had defeated attorney Bradley K. Greenway.

Court of Appeals (Biggs seat)
Incumbent Loretta Copeland Biggs, a Democrat, was narrowly defeated by Sanford L. Steelman, Jr., a Republican. There were no primaries.

Court of Appeals (Bryant seat)
Incumbent Wanda G. Bryant, a Democrat, was defeated by District Court Judge Ann Marie Calabria, a Republican.

In the Republican primary, Calabria had defeated Nathanael K. (Nate) Pendley.

Court of Appeals (Campbell seat)
Incumbent Hugh Brown Campbell, Jr., a Democrat, was defeated by District Court Judge Eric Levinson, a Republican.

In the Republican primary, Levinson had defeated Lorrie L. Dollar.

Court of Appeals (Thomas seat)
In the open-seat contest, Martha Geer, a Democrat, narrowly defeated Bill Constangy, a Republican.

In the Democratic primary, Geer had defeated Marcus W. Williams.

Court of Appeals (Walker seat)
In the open-seat contest, Rick Elmore, a Republican, defeated George R. Barrett, a Democrat.

In the Democratic primary, Barrett had defeated Beecher Reynolds Gray. In the Republican primary, Elmore had defeated Fritz Mercer.

References
State Board of Elections - 2002 General Election Results
State Board of Elections - 2002 Primary Election Results

Judicial
2002